William Francis Pohl (16 September 1937 – 9 December 1988) was an American mathematician, specializing in differential geometry and known for the Clifton–Pohl torus.

Pohl received from the University of Chicago his B.A in 1957 and his M.A.1958. He completed his Ph.D. at Berkeley in 1961 under the direction of Shiing-Shen Chern with dissertation Differential Geometry of Higher Order.  His dissertation was published in 1962 in the journal Topology and has received over 120 citations in the mathematical literature. He was a member of the mathematics faculty at the University of Minnesota from September 1964 until his untimely death.

Pohl engaged in a famous controversy arguing against Francis Crick but, in view of additional empirical evidence, conceded about 1979 or 1980 that Crick was correct.

Pohl sang liturgical music in Catholic religious services and wrote an article in 1966 from which the journal Sacred Music published an excerpt in 2011.

William Pohl later married Hildegard Bastian (now Hildegard Pohl), and fathered 5 children, Annetta Pohl, Agatha Pohl, Agnes Pohl, Lawrence Pohl, and John Pohl.

Selected publications

 with T. F. Banchoff: 
 with John Alvord Little: 
 with Nicolaas H. Kuiper:

References

20th-century American mathematicians
Differential geometers
Topologists
University of Chicago alumni
University of California, Berkeley alumni
University of Minnesota faculty
1937 births
1988 deaths